Marcello Curioni (born 28 May 1965) is an Italian male retired marathon runner, which participated at the 1997 World Championships in Athletics.

Achievements

References

External links

1965 births
Living people
Italian male marathon runners
World Athletics Championships athletes for Italy